Sayed Mirza Molimadail (born 14 February 1938) is an Iranian athlete. He competed in the men's discus throw at the 1964 Summer Olympics.

References

1938 births
Living people
Athletes (track and field) at the 1964 Summer Olympics
Iranian male discus throwers
Olympic athletes of Iran
Place of birth missing (living people)